The Wigan by-election of 11 March 1942 was held after the death of the incumbent Labour MP, John Parkinson.

The by-election was only contested by one candidate, William Foster, who retained the seat for Labour unopposed.

Result of the by-election

Result of the previous General Election
}

References

Wigan
Wigan
1940s in Lancashire
Elections in the Metropolitan Borough of Wigan
Wigan 1942
Wigan 1942
Unopposed by-elections to the Parliament of the United Kingdom (need citation)